The Philatelic Traders' Society Ltd. (PTS) is a trade association for stamp dealers and philatelic traders which was established in Britain in 1929 and continues to this day.

Activities 
The Society acts as a trade association on behalf of philatelic dealers, providing a Code of Conduct, an Arbitration Scheme, a trade directory, a special insurance scheme and similar services.

The Society has stated that it represents members who trade in philatelic material and who provide professional expertise only and that investment advice and encouraging philatelic investment is outside the scope of the Society.

Through its company PTS Stamp and Coin Exhibitions Ltd it organises the long-running British stamp exhibition Stampex twice each year, in the autumn and in the spring.

The majority of the Society's members are based in the United Kingdom but there are also a number of international philatelic dealers in the membership.

History 
The society was formed in 1929 and was incorporated as The Philatelic Traders' Society Limited on 14 September 1946. The company is registered at Companies House in Cardiff as company number 419382.

The first Chairman was Albert H. Harris and the first Secretary was Vera Trinder. The current Chairman is Suzanne Rae (2018/2019). The current Executive Secretary is Lucie Warren.  The current Company Secretary is Megan Tester. The society is located in Lingfield, Surrey.

People 
The current, active PTS Council is available on the society website.

Names of the current PTS Directors can be found at Companies House.

See also 
American Stamp Dealers Association

References

External links 

 
Australasian Philatelic Traders' Association
New Zealand Stamp Dealers Association
Philatelic Traders Society Facts And Information.

Philatelic organisations based in the United Kingdom
Professional associations based in the United Kingdom